Melaka Warrior Monument, officially the Melaka Warrior Monument for the Chinese victims of Anti-Japanese occupation is a monument at Bukit Cina in Malacca City, Malacca, Malaysia. It was built to commemorate the Chinese victims of the Empire of Japan occupation of Malacca as part of British Straits Settlements during World War II and was unveiled officially by then high commissioner, Sir Edward Gent in 1948. The first known major renovation for the monument was in 1972. The monument is inscribed with four Chinese characters, "忠貞足式" (pinyin: Zhōng Zhēn Zú Shì) in Chiang Kai-shek's handwriting, which means "their (those who have fought against the Japanese) loyalty can be taken as an exemplar".

Epitaph
The epitaph is written in Classical Chinese and is translated as below:

Commemorative tablet
A tablet commemorating the unveiling of the monument reads:

See also
 List of tourist attractions in Malacca

References

1948 establishments in Malaya
Buildings and structures in Malacca City
Monuments and memorials in Malaysia
Chinese cemeteries